Matambú is a district of the Hojancha canton, in the Guanacaste province of Costa Rica.

It is the only chorotega indigenous territory

History 
Matambú was created on 25 July 2017 by Ley 9463.

Geography 
Matambú has an elevation of  metres.

Demographics 

For the 2011 census, Matambú had not been created, therefore no census data is available as its inhabitants were part of other districts.

Transportation

Road transportation 
The district is covered by the following road routes:
 National Route 158

References 

Districts of Guanacaste Province
Populated places in Guanacaste Province